Akul Pandove (born 21 December 1997) is an Indian cricketer. He made his first-class debut on 17 December 2019, for Punjab in the 2019–20 Ranji Trophy.

References

External links
 

1997 births
Living people
Indian cricketers
Punjab, India cricketers
Place of birth missing (living people)